Moses Lake is a city in Grant County, Washington, United States. The population was 25,146 as of the 2020 census. Moses Lake is the largest city in Grant County. The city anchors the Moses Lake Micropolitan area, which includes all of Grant County and is part of the Moses Lake–Othello combined statistical area.

Before it was dammed in the early 1900s and then incorporated into the Columbia Basin Project, Moses Lake was a smaller shallow lake. To the south of the town is the Potholes Reservoir and the Columbia National Wildlife Refuge that has a number of seep lakes and vast amounts of migratory birds and other fauna natural to the area.

History

Before the construction of Grand Coulee Dam on the Columbia River in 1941 and Moses Lake Army Air Base in 1942 the area was largely barren. Native Americans knew the area as Houaph, which meant willow. Chief Moses was leader of the Sinkiuse tribe from 1859 to 1899, and was forced to negotiate with white settlers who began to settle in the area in the 1880s. Under pressure from the government, Chief Moses traded the Columbia Basin land for a reservation that stretched from Lake Chelan north to the Canada–US border. The government later traded again for what is now the Colville Indian Reservation.

The new settlers named the lake in honor of Chief Moses. The city was originally named Neppel, after a town in Germany where one of the original settlers had lived. The first settlers established fisheries and farms — some of the first exported items were carp, jackrabbits and fruit — but irrigation attempts failed and settlers left at about the same rate as they came. When the town was incorporated and renamed Moses Lake in 1938, the population was estimated at 302 people.

The arrival of the air base in 1942 and irrigation water pumped from Grand Coulee Dam in 1955 offered newcomers a reason and a way to settle in an area that previously had little to offer other than good fishing and a place to water sheep and cattle. Moses Lake was quickly transformed into a hub for a vast region where transportation, agriculture and recreation came together.

The air base was built to train World War II pilots to fly the P-38 Lightning and B-17 Flying Fortress, two planes that were essential to the war effort. The base was closed after the war ended, but reopened in 1948 as a U.S. Air Force base and test area for Boeing's B-47 Stratojet and B-50 Superfortress.

The B-47 tests led to development of modern commercial jetliners still used today. Fighter jets were stationed there to protect Grand Coulee Dam to the north and the Hanford site to the south. Boeing still uses the airport as a test and evaluation facility for its aircraft. Japan Airlines used the airport as a training area from November 1968 until March 2009. The old air base is now owned by the Port of Moses Lake and is home to Grant County International Airport, Big Bend Community College and several businesses.

Farmers, meanwhile, had developed new methods to irrigate water from the lake and from the Columbia River and began planting expansive irrigated acreage. When the Columbia Basin Project began to deliver water to the area in the mid-1950s, farms expanded by thousands of acres, growing potatoes, corn, onions, carrots and sugar beets.

In little more than a decade, Moses Lake's population grew from 300 to 2,679 in 1950. Today, the population is 25,146 (2020 census).

Geography

Landscape

Demographics

2020 census
As of the census of 2020, there were 26,102 people and 25,231 households. The population density was 1,292.7 inhabitants per square mile. The racial makeup of the city was 74.2% White, 1.4% African American, 1.1% Native American, 2% Asian, 0% Pacific Islander, and 8.9% from two or more races. Hispanic or Latino of any race were 29% of the population.

2010 census
As of the census of 2010, there were 20,366 people, 7,600 households, and 4,995 families residing in the city. The racial makeup of the city was 76.4% White, 1.6% African American, 1.0% Native American, 1.5% Asian, 0.1% Pacific Islander, 14.9% from other races, and 4.4% from two or more races. Hispanic or Latino of any race were 30.1% of the population.

There were 7,600 households, of which 38.4% had children under the age of 18 living with them, 46.3% were married couples living together, 13.2% had a female householder with no husband present, 6.2% had a male householder with no wife present, and 34.3% were non-families. 27.6% of all households were made up of individuals, and 10.9% had someone living alone who was 65 years of age or older. The average household size was 2.66 and the average family size was 3.25.

The median age in the city was 32.1 years. 29.6% of residents were under the age of 18; 9.6% were between the ages of 18 and 24; 27% were from 25 to 44; 21.4% were from 45 to 64; and 12.3% were 65 years of age or older. The gender makeup of the city was 49.4% male and 50.6% female.

2000 census
As of the census of 2000, there were 14,953 people, 5,642 households, and 3,740 families residing in the city. The population density was 1,468.6 people per square mile (567.1/km2). There were 6,263 housing units at an average density of 615.1 per square mile (237.5/km2). The racial makeup of the city was 77.16% White, 1.69% African American, 1.02% Native American, 1.43% Asian, 0.07% Pacific Islander, 15.44% from other races, and 3.20% from two or more races. Hispanic or Latino of any race were 25.41% of the population.

There were 5,642 households, out of which 35.1% had children under the age of 18 living with them, 50.3% were married couples living together, 11.5% had a female householder with no husband present, and 33.7% were non-families. 27.4% of all households were made up of individuals, and 11.2% had someone living alone who was 65 years of age or older. The average household size was 2.60 and the average family size was 3.20.

In the city, the population was spread out, with 28.8% under the age of 18, 10.6% from 18 to 24, 28.0% from 25 to 44, 19.0% from 45 to 64, and 13.5% who were 65 years of age or older. The median age was 32 years. For every 100 females, there were 96.3 males. For every 100 females age 18 and over, there were 94.1 males.

The median income for a household in the city was $36,467, and the median income for a family was $42,096. Males had a median income of $34,945 versus $25,193 for females. The per capita income for the city was $16,644. About 11.0% of families and 15.1% of the population were below the poverty line, including 18.7% of those under age 18 and 10.5% of those age 65 or over.

Climate
Moses Lake has a dry climate, and is classed as a semi-arid climate. It is warm during summer, when temperatures tend to be in the 80s (°F) and somewhat cold during winter, when temperatures tend to be in the 30s (°F).

Temperature variations between night and day are greater during summer, and less during winter.

The annual average precipitation at Moses Lake is 7.69 inches (195 mm). Although rainfall is fairly evenly distributed throughout the year, it is not unusual in mid-summer for a month or six weeks to pass without any measurable rainfall. The wettest month is December with an average rainfall of 1.19 inches (30 mm).

Economy

Moses Lake's historic economic base has been agriculture, but now includes considerable manufacturing and technology. Several companies have moved to the area, including REC Silicon (one of the world's largest manufacturers of polysilicon, used in solar panels). Moses Lake has also attracted some alternative fuel companies, such as Washington Ethanol & Washington Biodiesel.

BMW, in partnership with the SGL Group, began construction in July 2010 on a $100 million carbon-fiber manufacturing plant. The plant was designed to produce 300 tons of carbon fiber per year from a single production building, and began operations in 2011. In 2013, ground was broken for a second 300-ton building, bringing projected production to 600 tons per year. In 2014, a third 300-ton building was started. When the third building is completed, SGL Moses Lake will be the largest producer of carbon fiber in the world. Mitsubishi in 2016 announced that the company would use the port of Moses Lake for its new regional jet (MRJ) FAA flight testing. The testing will be completed by the end of 2018. 
Other major corporations that have facilities in (or are based in) Moses Lake include:
Boeing
Dell
Sabey
Terex/AWP (Genie Industries)
Guardian Industries
ConAgra Foods
Basic American Foods
Moses Lake Industries
J.R. Simplot Co.
International Paper

Media
Columbia Basin Herald, the local daily newspaper
ifiber, a local internet services provider

Transportation

Road
Moses Lake is bisected by two major highways that bypass the city center: Interstate 90 and State Route 17. State Route 171 and Interstate 90 Business serve the city's downtown, connecting to the two highways.

Rail
The Columbia Basin Railroad is headquartered in Moses Lake and operates the city's railroad. It is the busiest shortline railroad in Eastern Washington.

During the 1990s, a high-speed rail line between Seattle and Moses Lake was proposed, primarily to use Grant County International Airport as a satellite airport for the Seattle metropolitan area.

Public transportation
Moses Lake and Grant County are served by the Grant Transit Authority, which runs several bus routes within the city and intercity bus service to nearby Ephrata and other towns.

Airport
Larson Air Force Base, five miles from the city of Moses Lake, originally was named Moses Lake Army Air Base. It was activated on 24 November 1942 as a World War II training center. Major Donald A. Larson, for whom the base was later renamed, was from Yakima, Washington.

The Secretary of Defense announced on November 19, 1965, that Larson was to be closed by June of the following year. Larson Air Force Base, since renamed Grant County International Airport, is now a world-class heavy jet training and testing facility used by the Boeing Company, the U.S. military and NASA. The airport had hosted Japan's national carrier, Japan Airlines, from 1968 to 2008 for the training of its pilots, co-pilots, and flight engineers due to lack of runway space at airports in Japan to do touch and goes with jumbo jets. Columbia Pacific Aviation now handles charter passenger service to and from Moses Lake.

Moses Lake is also served by the much smaller municipal airport, which has one runway.

Education

Schools

Elementary schools
 Garden Heights Elementary
 Groff Elementary
 Knolls Vista Elementary
 Lakeview Terrace Elementary
 Larson Heights Elementary
 Longview Elementary
 Midway Elementary
 North Elementary
 Peninsula Elementary
 Park Orchard Elementary
 Sage Point Elementary

Middle schools
Frontier Middle School
Columbia Middle School (was Chief Moses Middle School)
Endeavor Middle School (was Columbia Basin Secondary School)

Private schools
AIM School and Gymnastics (Kindergarten and 1st Grade)
Glenn J. Kimber Academy
Moses Lake Christian Academy
Crest View Christian School
Covenant Christian School

High schools
 Moses Lake High School
 Vanguard Academy
 Digital Learning Center
 Columbia Basin Technical Skills Center (CBTech)

Learning centers
Family Services of Grant County / Head Start
Skillsource
Columbia Basin Job Corps Civilian Conservation Center

The Japanese Supplementary School of Moses Lake (モーゼスレイク補習授業校 Mōzesu Reiku Hoshū Jugyō Kō), a weekend Japanese educational program, previously operated in Moses Lake.

Colleges
Big Bend Community College

Activities
 Spring Festival (Memorial Day weekend)
 Moses Lake Water Sports Festival (June) (first held in June 2008)
 Lion's Field, located Downtown near Frontier Middle School, was remodeled after a voter-approved levy. FieldTurf was installed and the first game held on the new turf was a soccer game between the Moses Lake Chiefs and the Wenatchee Panthers. The Football team opened the completed stadium on September 12, 2008.
 Brews and Tunes (First held in February 2018)
 Moses Lake Sand Dunes are open year-round to 4x4 and ORV enthusiasts. The Sand Dunes bring people from all over the world to play in the sand.

Sister cities
Moses Lake has one sister city: Yonezawa, Japan. On August 7, 1978, the mayor of Moses Lake, Don Swanson, wrote a letter to Mayor Toshihide Cho of Yonezawa City, inviting Yonezawa to become a "Sister City" to Moses Lake. The 1981 group to visit Yonezawa City in May became the "Official Delegation" since it was during this visit that the "Sister City Agreement" between Yonezawa City and Moses Lake was signed by Mayor Bob Hill and Mayor Toshihide Cho on May 1, 1981. As part of the program, a small group of high school students from both cities are invited to take part in a cultural exchange. Since its inception, over 200 students and their family members from these two communities have taken part in this exchange. The two cities continue to exchange students every summer since 1981 and marked the 40th anniversary of this program on May 1, 2021.

There is a street named after Yonezawa in Moses Lake and a street named after Moses Lake in Yonezawa. The large hawk statue located on the west end of Yonezawa Boulevard is called an Otaka Poppo. These wood carvings, known as sasano bori, are special wood carvings unique to Yonezawa. These wooden dolls have been given as gifts to Moses Lake residents can be found on display around the city and on the campus of Big Bend Community College. Japanese lanterns, some which are gifts from citizens of Yonezawa, can be found around Moses Lake on Yonezawa Boulevard and inside the Japanese Garden.

Notable people

T. R. Bryden, MLB pitcher
Jason Buck, NFL defensive lineman
Matt Cedeño, actor
Ryan Doumit, MLB catcher for the Minnesota Twins
Clarence Gilyard, actor who performed on Matlock and Walker, Texas Ranger
Pierson Fodé, actor
Dave Heaverlo, MLB pitcher
Joe Hooper, Medal of Honor recipient in Vietnam
Reid Stowe, sailor and adventurer
Martha Thomsen - Model - Born in Moses Lake 25 January 1957
Kirk A. Triplett, PGA golfer
Joseph J. Tyson, Roman Catholic bishop of Yakima diocese
Bryan Warrick, NBA player for the Washington Bullets, Los Angeles Clippers, Milwaukee Bucks, and Indiana Pacers
Alexys Nycole Sanchez, actress
Rachell "Rae" Hofstetter, American internet personality

References

External links
City of Moses Lake
Columbia Basin Herald newspaper

 
Cities in Washington (state)
Cities in Grant County, Washington
Superfund sites in Washington (state)
Micropolitan areas of Washington (state)